Mehan Garden is an open space in Manila, Philippines. It was established in 1858 by the Spanish colonial authorities as a botanical garden, called the Jardín Botánico, outside the walled city.

History

Botanical garden
The garden established by Governor Fernándo Norzagaray y Escudero was one of a number of botanical gardens established in Asia by European colonial powers (for example, Acharya Jagadish Chandra Bose Indian Botanic Garden in 1787 and Bogor Botanical Gardens in 1817).

Sebastián Vidal was the best known director of the garden. He came to the Philippines in 1871 to work in the forestry service (Inspección General de Montes). He was director between 1878 and his death in 1889. His obituary in Popular Science Monthly described him as "practically a pioneer in the investigation of the Philippine flora". (In fact, a flora of the archipelago had been published by Francisco Manuel Blanco, but it was unsatisfactory).  For his publications on Philippine flora, Vidal not only collected specimens, but also studied Malesian flora held in European herbaria, such as the Kew herbarium.

Public park
The American occupiers of Manila decided that the site was not suitable for a botanical garden and was more suitable for a public park.
In 1913 it was renamed after John C. Mehan, who was in charge of Manila's parks and sanitation. The Mehan Garden was declared a historical site by the National Historical Institute in 1934.

The Garden is the open space off Liwasang Bonifacio (across the Philippine Post Office Main Building), bounded by Taft Avenue, LRT 1 Central Terminal station, the Metropolitan Theater, and Manila City Hall. Inside the Garden are structures such as the Lawton Park n' Ride building and the Universidad de Manila.

Boy Scouts of the Philippines Headquarters 
Following World War II, Boy Scouts of the Philippines (BSP) co-founder Don Gabriel Daza established the first BSP national office in the garden. The office was in a quonset hut. In 1949, the BSP relocated after receiving a land grant from Republic Act No.397.

Gallery

See also
 List of parks in Manila

References

Parks in Manila
Cultural Properties of the Philippines in Metro Manila
Botanical gardens in the Philippines
Landmarks in the Philippines
History of Manila
Spanish colonial infrastructure in the Philippines
Buildings and structures in Ermita
National Historical Landmarks of the Philippines